The 2005 election for Mayor of Los Angeles took place on March 8, 2005, with a run-off election on May 17, 2005. In a rematch of the 2001 election, Councilman Antonio Villaraigosa defeated the sitting mayor, James Hahn, becoming the city's first Hispanic mayor since the 19th century.

Municipal elections in California, including Mayor of Los Angeles, are officially nonpartisan; candidates' party affiliations do not appear on the ballot.

Background 
Philanthropist Eli Broad endorsed Hahn. State Senator Gil Cedillo, Councilman Eric Garcetti, and Councilman Cindy Miscikowski, who all endorsed Villaraigosa in 2001, switched sides and endorsed Hahn.

Governor Arnold Schwarzenegger promised Hahn that he would not participate in the election. As such, Schwarzenegger did not endorse any candidates, however he has expressed broad support for Hertzberg's plan to break up the Los Angeles Unified School District. His Education Secretary, and former mayor of Los Angeles, Richard Riordan campaigned heavily for Hertzberg.

Polling

Results
Although Villaraigosa garnered the plurality of votes in the general election, his lack of an outright majority forced a special election between him and the incumbent Hahn. With less than 34% of registered voters participating, Villaraigosa won the runoff.

With his election, Villaraigosa became the first Latino mayor of Los Angeles since 1872. Hahn became the first incumbent to lose re-election in 32 years since Sam Yorty lost to Tom Bradley in the 1973 Los Angeles mayoral election.

Primary election

General election

Notes

References

External links
 Office of the City Clerk, City of Los Angeles

Mayoral election, 2005
2005 California elections
2005
Los Angeles